"Supersonics" is a song by the alternative rock band The Presidents of the United States of America. The song was released as a promotional CD in order to coincide with the Seattle SuperSonics' appearance in the 1996 NBA Finals. The music for the song was the same as their earlier song "Supermodel," but with new lyrics to reflect the then-current stars of the team.

Track listing
 "Supersonics" - 2:41

Notes
The single was only available for purchase at the SuperSonics' team store.
The voice of the SuperSonics, Kevin Calabro, speaks the last line of the song. He also provided soundbites from his play-by-play from past games.
The Presidents of the United States of America (band) donated their portion of the proceeds from this single to Artists for a Hate Free America and Rock for Choice. The Seattle SuperSonics donated their proceeds from the single to the Sonics Net Foundation.
The band played "Supersonics" for a final time on February 12, 2010 at The Showbox in Seattle.
The band played "Supersonics" for a Sonics Arena rally at Occidental Park in Seattle on June 14, 2012.
The song was featured in the Webby Award-winning documentary Sonicsgate, playing during the movie and credits in both the free online director's cut in 2009 and the re-cut version that aired on CNBC in 2012.

1996 singles
The Presidents of the United States of America (band) songs
Seattle SuperSonics
1996 songs